Caladenia carnea, commonly known as pink fingers, is a plant in the orchid family Orchidaceae and is endemic to eastern and south-eastern Australia, including Tasmania. It has a single thin, green leaf and one to five white or pink flowers with red stripes and two rows of yellow-tipped "calli" on their labellum.

Description

The flowers are sometimes sweetly scented or musky. Their outer surface is greenish-pink, sometimes striped, and the inner surface is pinkish or greenish white. The sides of the labellum turn upwards while the centre part has a toothed edge, usually with yellow calli and there are two lines of raised, club-like, yellow-tipped calli in the centre. The column is curved with red bars on the inside surface and has narrow wings on its sides. Flowering occurs between August and November and is followed by a non-fleshy, dehiscent capsule containing a large number of seeds.

This species is often confused with Caladenia fuscata but that species always has one flower per plant and flowers a few weeks earlier than C. carnea.

Taxonomy
Caladenia carnea was first formally described by Robert Brown in 1810 and the description was published in Prodromus Florae Novae Hollandiae. In 2001, David Jones and Mark Clements proposed changing the name to Petalochilus carneus but the change has not been widely accepted.

Distribution and habitat
Pink fingers orchid occurs in Queensland south from Hervey Bay, the eastern half of New South Wales, most of Victoria apart from the alps and far north west of that state. It also occurs in south-eastern South Australia and Tasmania. It grows in a wide range of habitats including heath, scrubland, woodland and forest, preferring well-drained soil. It often survives land clearing.

References

carnea
Plants described in 1810
Endemic orchids of Australia
Orchids of South Australia
Orchids of Tasmania
Orchids of Victoria (Australia)
Orchids of New South Wales
Orchids of Queensland
Taxa named by Robert Brown (botanist, born 1773)